The Magic Finger is a British 1966 children's story, written by Roald Dahl. It was first published in the United States, by Harper & Row, as a picture book illustrated by William Pène du Bois. Allen & Unwin published a Pène du Bois edition in the U.K. in 1968. Later editions have been illustrated by Pat Marriott, Tony Ross, and Quentin Blake. The novel was adapted into a 1990 TV special.

Synopsis
The Magic Finger is narrated by an unnamed 8-year-old girl (voiced alternately by Anne Clements and Caroline Quentin in the United Kingdom), who is growing up on a remote rural farm in the English countryside, next door to the Gregg family who has a passion for hunting animals and birds. The title "Magic Finger" is an ability she has that activates inadvertently whenever she gets angry: the finger itself shoots out a beam of electrical energy that apparently seeks out whoever has angered the girl, with unpredictable consequences. For example, when the girl's teacher shames her for misspelling the word "cat", the magic finger gives her whiskers and a bushy tail, and the girl cryptically states that she was never quite the same again.

One day, the girl sees Mr. Gregg and his two sons, (Philip and William, Philip also 8 years of age and William Gregg 11 years old,) returning home from a hunt with a deer that they have just killed, and they make fun of her when she shouts at them. In a rage, the unnamed 8-year-old girl puts the Magic Finger itself on the entire family: then they wake up the following morning to find that they have shrunk to bird-size and developed "ducks' wings" in place of their arms and hands. While trying out their new wings, the Greggs fly out of their beloved house, which is promptly occupied by four human-sized ducks with human arms and human hands, and they are all soon forced to build a nest in an old tree for the night.

The following morning, the Greggs all find that, in a major reversal of their habits, three out of four of the ducks are holding the Greggs' hunting guns in their hands. Desperately, Mr and Mrs Gregg both persuade the ducks not to shoot them, but the mother duck (the only duck who never holds a gun) taunts them about their own fondness for shooting, especially since the previous day, they somehow shot all 6 of the duck's precious children. Mr Gregg tells the duck mother to give up shooting and he destroys all 3 guns with a big hammer, swearing never to hurt another duck, deer "or anything else again": the four ducks then head back towards the lake where they live, before letting the Greggs leave their tree. Then, the Greggs all find themselves returned to normal by magic.

The 8-year-old girl comes by the Greggs' farm to see that the Gregg family (now changing their surname to Egg) have fully changed their ways and are now feeding and caring for the birds. As Philip and William tell the girl their entire story, the sound of gunfire in the distance attracts the girl's attention, and she feels the Magic Finger charging up again. The story ends, as the girl runs towards the sound that she can hear in the distance.

References

External links

 

Children's books by Roald Dahl
1967 children's books

British picture books
Harper & Row books 
American picture books
Hunting in popular culture
British fantasy novels
Books about magic